Ben Bu Cihana Sığmazam is a Turkish action TV drama that was produced by Güzel Adamlar Medya and aired on ATV on September 20, 2022. Oktay Kaynarca, Ebru Özkan and Pelin Akil are in the leading roles.

Filming locations 
The drama is mainly filmed in Istanbul. Some episodes in the series were filmed in Samarkand as well.

Cast 

 Oktay Kaynarca – Cezayir Türk / Temur Turan
 Ebru Özkan Saban – Leyla Turk
 Pelin Akil – Firuze Turan
 Işıl Yücesoy – Gulendam
 Ali Seckiner Alici – Kurban Baba
 Hakan Karahan – Dumrul
 Erkan Sever – Orhan
 Ragıp Savaş – Atakan
 Gulenay Kalkan – Elmas
 Eren Vurdem – Azamet (Yumruk Azamet) 
 Aslı Sevi – Azade
 Kerem Kupaci – Ethem 
 Ziya Kurkut – Bekir

General view

Episodes

Reference 

Turkish drama television series